The 1959 Kilkenny Senior Hurling Championship was the 65th staging of the Kilkenny Senior Hurling Championship since its establishment by the Kilkenny County Board.

On 29 November 1959, Bennettsbridge won the championship after a 4-06 to 1-04 defeat of Erin's Own in the final. It was their sixth championship title overall and their first title in three championship seasons.

Results

Final

References

Kilkenny Senior Hurling Championship
Kilkenny Senior Hurling Championship